The Del Rio Texas Port of Entry is located at the Del Río – Ciudad Acuña International Bridge.  A pontoon bridge was first built around 1919, and it was replaced by a more permanent bridge in 1929 built by the Citizens Bridge Company.  That bridge was replaced in 1987.

The current port of entry facility was rebuilt by the General Services Administration in 2004.

References

See also

 List of Mexico–United States border crossings
 List of Canada–United States border crossings

Mexico–United States border crossings
Del Rio, Texas
1919 establishments in Texas
Buildings and structures completed in 1919
Buildings and structures in Val Verde County, Texas